This is a summary of the year 2011 in the Irish music industry.

Summary 

On Wednesday 12 January, the Choice Music Prize nominations for Best Irish Album of 2010 were announced.
On Thursday 3 February, the inaugural Digital Socket Awards were held at the Grand Social, Dublin.
On Thursday 3 March, Two Door Cinema Club's debut album Tourist History was awarded the Choice Music Prize for Best Irish Album of 2010 at a ceremony at Vicar Street, Dublin. The event was broadcast live on Today FM and supported by IMRO and IRMA.
In February, the nominations for the 2011 Meteor Awards were scheduled to be announced, with the main event to take place in March 2011, but the entire event was cancelled completely when Meteor cancelled its sponsorship.
On 28 May, Kings of Leon headlined a sold-out 30th anniversary Slane Concert.
On 2 July, The Script performed their first stadium headlining concert at the Aviva Stadium.
From 8–11 July, Oxegen 2011 took place, with headline acts Arctic Monkeys, Black Eyed Peas and Foo Fighters.
On 19 October, Westlife officially announced they were splitting after an album and a tour.
On 6 November, Belfast's Odyssey Arena hosted the 2011 MTV Europe Music Awards.
On 21 November 2011, nominees were announced for the Irish Music Television Awards. The awards ceremony took place at The Sugar Club in Dublin on 28 November 2011.
On 21 December 2011, MCD confirmed Oxegen 2012 would not take place but said that Oxegen 2013 would take place.
The Royseven song "We Should Be Lovers", taken from the album You Say, We Say, was the most played Irish song on radio in 2011.

Albums & EPs 
Below is a list of notable albums & EPs released by Irish artists in Ireland in 2011.

Singles 
Below is a list of notable singles released by Irish artists in Ireland in 2011.

Festivals

Oxegen 2011 

Foo Fighters
Arctic Monkeys
Blink-182
Paolo Nutini
The Black Eyed Peas

Slane 2011 
Kings of Leon

Awards

IMTV Awards 2011 
The 2011 Irish Music Television Awards took place at The Sugar Club in Dublin on 28 November 2011. Below are the winners:

References

External links 
 IMRO website
 IRMA website
 Hot Press website
 State website
 MUSE.ie
 CLUAS.com
 News at Phantom FM
 Music at The Irish Times
 Music at the Irish Independent
 Music news and album reviews at RTÉ